"Flawless" is the second single from Phife Dawg's debut album Ventilation: Da LP.

Background
The song is mainly about Phife's disputes with Jive Records, former bandmate Q-Tip (due to his newly adopted style in rap and appearance), and at the music industry in general. The music video shows Phife performing in front of a crowd and riding around. Also he is filming the video while the director makes absurd decisions.

Chart positions

2000 singles
Phife Dawg songs
2000 songs
Songs written by Phife Dawg
Songs written by Hi-Tek